Colección Patricia Phelps de Cisneros (CPPC) is a privately held Latin American art organization based in Venezuela and New York City founded by Patricia Phelps de Cisneros and Gustavo Cisneros.

History 
In the 1970s, during Patricia Phelps de Cisneros' travels across Latin America with her husband, Gustavo Cisneros, she spent her time visiting artists in their studios and seeing art in local galleries and museums, and began actively purchasing and collecting artwork. Primarily collecting indigenous work during frequent expeditions through Venezuela, especially around the Orinoco in the Amazon River Basin.

As her collection grew, Cisneros saw that Latin American art was under-represented in the international art community, so the Colección Patricia Phelps de Cisneros (CPPC) was formed in the 1990s, with a goal of bringing visibility and impact to the way Latin American art history is viewed and appreciated. That effort has included a four-pronged approach: An ambitious approach to lending artworks around the world, working with scholars and academics to learn more about the artists and their works, the creation of a publications program to provide supporting information about the artists and their work, and building an online forum for the artwork.

Collection 
The CPPC is best known for its collection of Modernist geometric abstraction from Latin America and also comprises holdings of Latin American landscapes by traveler artists to Latin America in the 17th to 19th centuries; furniture and art from Latin America's colonial period; contemporary art from Latin America; and an important group of art and artifacts from indigenous peoples of Venezuela's Amazonas region, the Orinoco Collection. The mission of the Colección Patricia Phelps de Cisneros is to enhance appreciation of the diversity, sophistication, and range of art from Latin America.

Gradually, Cisneros began acquiring geometric abstract artwork that had been under-appreciated. It gradually grew into a significant holding of 20th century Latin American abstract art. She has appeared on top collector lists every year since 1998. Cisneros has been lending her collections to international exhibitions and institutions since 1999.

Cisneros credits her understanding of the importance of stewardship as a collector to her great-grandfather, William H Phelps, who meticulously cataloged his ornithological collection. She has said that her aesthetic developed as a result of having grown up in the modernist society of Caracas in the 1950s and 1960s.

The collection is organized in five categories that are areas of focus: Modern art, Contemporary art, Colonial art, the Orinoco collection, which is an ethnographic collection that traces the cultural production of 12 indigenous groups from the Orinoco River Basin, and the Traveler Artists to Latin America collection.

Modern art 
The modern art collection is made up of works by Latin American artists who were active in the twentieth century. The focus is on artists who work in the geometric abstraction movements of modern art in Argentina, Brazil, Uruguay and Venezuela, with additional focus on artists working in both Europe and North America that have a connection to the history of Latin American art.

La Invención Concreta is a micro-site, publication, and series of exhibitions that reflect the growth of geometric abstraction movements in South America from 1930 to late 1970.

Contemporary art 
This collection consists of contemporary artists from Latin America as well as other artists from other areas. In addition to the collection of work by contemporary artists, the collection provides support for artists residencies and grant funding. The collection is actively involved in education-based programming.

Colonial art 
The Colonial art collection is focused on Colonial art and furnishings. This collection is made up of painting, furnishings and religious objects made in Venezuela from the Colonial Venezuela era that began in 1717 and continued throughout the Hispanic and Republican periods, leading up to the middle of the 19th century. It follows the independence of Venezuela and reflects the history of Venezuela's early development as a country.

Orinoco collection 
The Orinoco collection is an ethnographic collection that traces the cultural production of materials by 12 indigenous groups from the Venezuelan Orinoco River Basin (also known as the Amazonas region) through the collection of ethnographic objects and documents from the following areas:

 Baniva
 Baré
 De'áruwa (Piaroa)
 E'ñepa (Panare)
 Híwi (Guahibo)
 Hoti
 Puinave
 Wakuénai (Curripaco)
 Warekena
 Tsase (Píapoco)
 Yanomami
 Ye'kuana

The collection began in the 1970s during vacations in the Orinoco region with Cisneros' family, when Cisneros realized the materials were quickly disappearing.

Traveler Artists to Latin America 
The Traveler Artists to Latin America collection includes landscape art created by artists traveling to Latin America during the period that started in 1638 to the late 19th century. This collection reflects the development of Latin American landscape art, which started with Frans Post coming to Brazil from Amsterdam in 1637. The collection traces the trend of European and American artists coming to the region, an influx of visiting artists that led to the development of various national schools of paintings. The collection includes a Landscapes of the Americas collection, which is made up of drawings, paintings, photographs, prints, and watercolors from this time of active political change and reflects cultural exchange between Latin America and Spain and Portugal.

Partnerships 
Cisneros and the Colección Patricia Phelps de Cisneros have long-term relationships with various cultural institutions globally. Among these are Tate Modern, Museo Nacional Centro de Arte Reina Sofía, among many others.

In 2010, the Patricia Phelps de Cisneros Professorship in Latin American Art at Hunter College was established with a $1 million donation.

Cisneros has had a long-term relationship with the Museum of Modern Art in New York. The 2016 donation of 102 modern and contemporary Latin American artworks from the 1940s to 1990s to the Museum of Modern Art, which establishes the Patricia Phelps de Cisneros Research Institute for the Study of Art from Latin America at MoMA, join the previous donation by Colección Cisneros of over 40 other previously donated works. The gift is meant to be transformative and impactful on how Latin American art is valued and recognized globally. The gift includes works by Lygia Clark, Lygia Pape, Jesús Rafael Soto, Alejandro Otero, and Tomás Maldonado. Additional highlights are works by Willys de Castro, Hélio Oiticica, Juan Mele, Mira Schendel, and Gego.

The Patricia Phelps de Cisneros Research Institute for the Study of Art from Latin America is projected to open as a new wing at MoMA in 2019. In 2018, it was announced that Inés Katzenstein was appointed as the director of the newly formed Patricia Phelps de Cisneros Research Institute for the Study of Art from Latin America as well as the Curator of Latin American Art at the Museum of Modern Art.

In January 2018, it was announced that more than 200 artworks, many from contemporary artists, would be donated by the collection to six institutions: the Museum of Modern Art, who will receive 90 works; the Bronx Museum of the Arts; the Museo Nacional Centro de Arte Reina Sofía in Madrid, Spain; the Museo de Arte Moderno in Buenos Aires, Argentina; the Museo de Arte de Lima in Lima, Peru; and the Blanton Museum of Art at the University of Texas, Austin in Austin, Texas. The gifts include works by Amalia Pica (Argentina), Jac Leirner (Brazil), Luis Camnitzer (Uruguay), and Regina José Galindo (Guatemala).

As part of a discussion commemorating of the start of its fifth decade collecting art, in February 2018 Cisneros announced the upcoming donation of over 100 images from the traveler artists working in Latin America collection to Wikimedia Commons.

Selected artists in the Colección 

 Alejandro Otero
 Federico Herrero
 Fernanda Laguna
 Gego
 Hélio Oiticica
 Jac Leirner
 Jesús Rafael Soto
 Juan Melé
 Lygia Clark
 Lygia Pape
 Mira Schendel
 Tomás Maldonado
 Willys de Castro

Selected exhibitions 
Since 1999, CPPC has loaned and curated over 60 Latin American exhibitions globally.
 2001: "Geometric Abstraction: Latin American Art from the Patricia Phelps de Cisneros Collection." Fogg Museum of Art, Harvard University (Cambridge, Massachusetts). March 3–November 4, 2001
 2006: "The Rhythm of Color: Alejandro Otero and Willys de Castro – Two Modern Masters in the Colección Patricia Phelps de Cisneros." Aspen Institute (Aspen, Colorado). June 29–November 1, 2006
 2007: "The Geometry of Hope: Latin American Art from the Patricia Phelps de Cisneros Collection." Blanton Museum of Art at the University of Texas at Austin. February 20–April 22, 2007; Grey Art Gallery at New York University. September 13–December 8, 2007
 2010: "Desenhar no espaço (Fundação Iberê Camargo): Artistas abstratos do Brasil e da Venezuela na Coleção Patricia Phelps de Cisneros." Fundação Iberê Camargo (Porto Alegre, Brazil). July 29 – October 31, 2010
 2010–2011: "Desenhar no espaço (Pinacoteca do Estado de São Paulo): Artistas abstratos do Brasil e da Venezuela na Coleção Patricia Phelps de Cisneros." Pinacoteca do Estado de São Paulo (São Paulo, Brazil). November 27, 2010 – February 6, 2011
 2013: "La Invención Concreta: Colección Patricia Phelps de Cisneros." Museo Nacional Centro de Arte Reina Sofía (Madrid, Spain). January 23–September 16, 2013
 2014: "Radical Geometry: Modern Art of South America from the Patricia Phelps de Cisneros Collection." Royal Academy of Arts (London, England). July 5–September 28, 2014
 2015–2016: "Boundless Reality: Traveler Artists' Landscapes of Latin America from the Patricia Phelps de Cisneros Collection." Hunter College and the Americas Society (New York, New York). October 30, 2015 – January 23, 2016
 2017: "Vistas del sur: Traveler Artists' Landscapes of Latin America from the Patricia Phelps de Cisneros Collection." New Britain Museum of American Art (New Britain, Connecticut). January 20–April 16, 2017
 2017: "Overlook: Teresita Fernández Confronts Frederic Church at Olana." Olana State Historic Site (Columbia County, New York). May 14–November 5, 2017
 2017–2018: "Making Art Concrete: Works from Argentina and Brazil in the Colección Patricia Phelps de Cisneros." Getty Center (Los Angeles, California). August 29, 2017 – February 11, 2018
 2018: "Concrete Matters." Moderna Museet (Stockholm, Sweden). February 24–May 13, 2018

Selected publications 

   – Catalog of an exhibition held at Fundação Iberê Camargo, Porto Alegre, Brazil, July 29-Oct. 31, 2010 and at Pinacoteca do Estado de São Paulo, São Paulo, Brazil, Nov. 27, 2010-Jan. 30, 2011
   – Exhibition catalog of Cold America, Geometric Abstraction in Latin America (1934–1973), Fundación Juan March, Madrid, February 11-May 15, 2011
  
   – Published on the occasion of an exhibition of the same name held at Museo Nacional Centro de Arte Reina Sofía, Madrid, Spain, January 22-September 16, 2013
   – Obra publicada con motivo de la exposición homónima celebrada en el Museo Reina Sofía del 22 de enero al 16 de septiembre de 2013
   – Catalogue qui accompagne une exposition de la "Fundación Cisneros Orinoco Collection", tenu au "Museo Centro Gaiás" dans la "Cidade da Cultura de Galicia."
   – Published in conjunction with an exhibition organized by and held at the Brooklyn Museum, Sept. 20, 2013-Jan. 12, 2014. Also held at the Albuquerque Museum of Art and History, Feb. 16-May 18, 2014, New Orleans Museum of Art, Jun. 20-Sept. 21, 2014, and the John and Mable Ringling Museum of Art, Oct. 17, 2014-Jan. 11, 2015

References

Further reading 
   – Catalog of an exhibition held at the Beard and Weil Galleries, Wheaton College, Norton, Mass., Feb. 4-Apr. 10, 2008

External links 

 
  – Geometric abstract art from South America (1930s–1970s)
 

Arts organizations based in Venezuela
Arts organizations based in New York City
Art collections in the United States
Art collections in Venezuela
Arts organizations established in the 1970s